United Communist Party of Turkey (Turkish: Türkiye Birleşik Komünist Partisi) was a political party in Turkey.

History 
The leadership of two banned parties Communist Party of Turkey (TKP) and Workers Party of Turkey (TİP) who went to exile after the 1980 Turkish coup d'étatannounced on 8 October 1987 in Brussels that they had decided to merge and form TBKP. Nihat Sargın (general secretary of TİP) and  Yaşar Nabi Yağcı (Haydar Kutlu) (general secretary of TKP) returned to Turkey from exile in Europe with the stated aim to set up TBKP legally. However, they were promptly arrested and imprisoned. In 1988, it was announced that the merger was carried out and TBKP formed in a clandestine congress.

In 1989, several leading members of (clandestine) TBKP publicly disclosed their identity as TBKP leaders and members and stated the party's intention to operate legally. In 1990, Sargın and Yağcı were released from prison after a 19-days hunger strike to demand freedom and right to operate legally. Sargın, Yağcı and their followers finally launched TBKP as a formal political party the same year. Chairman of TBKP was Nihat Sargın and Nabi Yağcı was the general secretary. However, the Constitutional Court banned the party in 1991, and Sargın and Yağcı were banned from holding office in any other party. The case was taken up by the European Court of Human Rights, which found that the ban violated the Convention for the Protection of Human Rights and Fundamental Freedoms.

Before the Court officially banned the party, TBKP had held a legal congress (the first time-ever legal congress of communists in Turkey). In this congress, a resolution was adopted overwhelmingly calling on all its members to join a project to form a broader-based socialist party, the Socialist Unity Party (SBP), with other socialist groupings and individuals.
In the following years, Socialist Unity Party itself turned into United Socialist Party with the participation of yet other leftist groups. And finally this party merged with the former Revolutionary Path (Devrimci Yol) cadres to form the Freedom and Solidarity Party (ÖDP).

See also
List of illegal political parties in Turkey
Communist Party of Turkey (disambiguation), for other groups using similar names

References

External links
 The Case of the United Communist Party of Turkey (TBKP) and others v. Turkey

Article 11 of the European Convention on Human Rights
Banned political parties in Turkey
Defunct communist parties in Turkey
Political parties established in 1988
European Court of Human Rights cases involving Turkey
Banned communist parties